Jhankaar Beats is a 2003 Indian musical comedy film written and directed by Sujoy Ghosh in his feature directorial debut and produced by Pritish Nandy Communications. It stars Juhi Chawla, Sanjay Suri, Rahul Bose, debutant Shayan Munshi, Rinke Khanna and Riya Sen. This film is a story about love, friendship, and music and pays tribute to music of R. D. Burman.

Plot
Deep is happily married to Shanti, with a little daughter Muskaan and another baby on the way. Rishi is his best friend and colleague at an advertising agency. Rishi is a little immature and stubborn and this keeps on causing fights at home with his equally headstrong lawyer wife Nicki. Rishi and Deep are dedicated musicians, obsessive about the music of R.D. Burman. They play at a club sometimes and compete in an annual pop music contest called "Jhankaar Beats"  which they have lost for the past two years.

Rishi has been kicked out of his house by Nicki and the two are considering getting a divorce. Deep's nagging mother-in-law has come for a two-month visit. The men are under pressure to get an advertising campaign ready for a new client, an oddball condom manufacturer. Around this time they meet Neel, who is the son of their boss Mr. Kapoor and is joining the company.  Neel is an ace guitarist who has his own problems — he is attracted to a pretty girl, Preeti but cannot muster the courage to talk to her. To make things worse, his father has decided that he is wasting his life and has given him an ultimatum; find a girl in two months or settle down with a wife his parents choose. Rishi and Deep, though they tease him mercilessly, grow very fond of Neel, and he has a sure ally in Shanti. Shanti, meanwhile, is trying to get Rishi to see sense and make up with Nicki.

Rishi and Deep amidst hilarious situations eventually end up making Neel talk to Preeti, while also making sure they practice for the upcoming Jhankaar Beats competition. Meanwhile, Rishi gets a good offer to work outside the country but decides against it as he feels he wants to give another chance to him and Nicki.

Right before the competition, Rishi sees Nicki being comforted by her lawyer and decides that Nicki doesn't want him any more, and takes up that job abroad. On the day of the competition, he is leaving for the airport, much to the anger and disappointment of Deep, who had considered Rishi a brother and is now leaving him.

On the way to the airport, the taxi plays an R.D Burman song on the radio and Rishi realizes he is actually leaving his family. Deep and Neel on the way to the competition are surprised by Rishi turning up, and they decide to do a cover of an R.D Burman song for their performance, regardless of the outcome.

The film ends by showing Deep, Rishi and Neal having won the competition finally, and forming a band. Rishi eventually puts his ego aside and apologizes to Nicki. Deep becomes a father and names his son after their idol.

Cast
Sanjay Suri as Deep
Rahul Bose as Rishi Bhalla
Shayan Munshi as Indraneel "Neel" Kapoor
Juhi Chawla as Shanti Khanna
Shashikala as Shanti's mother
Rinke Khanna as Nicki 
Riya Sen as Preeti Sharma
Archana Puran Singh as Ms. Voluptuous, Rival Company Manager
Parmeet Sethi as Divorce lawyer of Nicky
Vijayendra Ghatge as Mr. Kapoor, Neel's father; Rishi and Deep's boss
Ikraa Khatri as Muskaan 
Raja Vaid as Vijay Dhupia
Kurush Deboo as Mr. Deboo, Absent-minded Divorced Lawyer of Rishi

Soundtrack
All the songs were composed by Vishal–Shekhar and the lyrics for this film were by penned by Vishal Dadlani. The soundtrack of the film features songs "Tu Aashiqui Hai", And "Suno Na" sung by playback singer KK and Shaan respectively and  written by Vishal Dadlani which became popular.

Reception
Deepa Gumaste of Rediff.com stated "The makers of Jhankaar Beats have come out with a very impressive and colourful publicity brochure full of catchy one-liners and glossy pictures. If only Ghosh had put together a film that lived up to the hype built around it." Taran Adarsh's 1.5 star review for Bollywood Hungama stated "On the whole, JHANKAAR BEATS has a few interesting moments but not enough to register an impression. At best, the film will appeal to a select few in metros, with its business prospects looking brighter at multiplexes mainly."

Sampada Sharma in her retrospective review for The Indian Express said "When Sujoy Ghosh made Jhankaar Beats in the year 2003, Indian cinema was still enamoured by the Dil Chahta Hai wave wherein the stories set in metropolitan cities following the urban men and women were the new ‘in’ thing. Jhankaar Beats was the result of this wave of films where Sujoy was trying to keep the essence of the olden days alive even as he looked towards the future of cinema, and tried to merge the two with the perfect tool – music."

References

External links
 

2003 films
2000s Hindi-language films
2000s buddy comedy films
2000s musical comedy films
2003 romantic comedy films
2000s romantic musical films
English-language Indian films
Films scored by Vishal–Shekhar
Indian buddy comedy films
Indian musical comedy films
Indian romantic comedy films
Indian romantic musical films
Pop music films
2003 directorial debut films
Films directed by Sujoy Ghosh